Fritz Wagner (19 March 1915 - 19 January 1982) was a German actor. He appeared in more than sixty films from 1939 to 1976.

Filmography

References

External links 

1915 births
1982 deaths
German male film actors